Ganj Peth is a general term, in the Marathi language, for a locality in the Indian cities. These include cities like Pune, Solapur, Madhavnagar, Karad, Ahmednagar etc.

Peths in Pune
Marathi language
Economy of Maharashtra